Nökkvi Þeyr Þórisson (born 13 August 1999) is an Icelandic footballer who plays as a winger for Belgian club Beerschot and the Iceland national team.

Club career
He started training with his local club Dalvík, switching to his father's old club Þór Akureyri for two separate spells before joining German side Hannover's youth team along with his twin brother Þorri Mar Þórisson.

In 2018 the brothers returned to their first club Dalvík/Reynir and played with them in the Icelandic 4th tier, with Nökkvi scoring 10 goals in 16 appearances. The next season they joined KA Akureyri in the Icelandic top tier and Nökkvi played with them for four seasons. In his final season with KA he helped them achieve 2nd place, their best result since winning the league for the only time in 1989, by becoming the top scorer of the 2022 Besta deild karla with 17 goals, despite leaving to join Belgian side Beerschot before the end  the season. By joining Beerschot, he and his twin brother were now playing for separate clubs for the first time.

International career
Nökkvi made his international debut for Iceland on 8 January 2023 in a friendly match against Estonia.

References

External links
 
 

1999 births
Living people
Nokkvi Theyr Thorisson
Nokkvi Theyr Thorisson
Nokkvi Theyr Thorisson
Association football midfielders
Nokkvi Theyr Thorisson
Nokkvi Theyr Thorisson
K Beerschot VA players
Nokkvi Theyr Thorisson
Challenger Pro League players
Nokkvi Theyr Thorisson
Expatriate footballers in Belgium
Nokkvi Theyr Thorisson